There are over 20,000 Grade II* listed buildings in England. This page is a list of these buildings in the district of Thurrock in Essex.

Thurrock

|}

Notes

External links

Lists of Grade II* listed buildings in Essex
 
Buildings and structures in Thurrock